The Victorian Netball League is a state netball league featuring teams from Victoria, Australia. The league is organised by Netball Victoria. The modern league was first played for during the 2009 season. It replaced an earlier state league as the top level netball competition in Victoria. On a national level, the VNL is effectively a third level league, below Suncorp Super Netball and the Australian Netball League. Between 2009 and 2011, due to sponsorship and naming rights arrangements, the VNL was also known as the Holden Cruze Cup. Since 2018, the league has been sponsored by Bupa and, as a result, it is also known as the Bupa Victorian Netball League. The league features ten teams who enter teams in three divisions – the Championship, Division 1 and an Under-19 division. Historically, the league's most successful team has been City West Falcons. Originally known as Hume City Falcons, they have won five Championships and fourteen premierships across all three divisions.

History

Foundation
The modern league was first played for during the 2009 season. It replaced an earlier Netball Victoria state league as the top level netball competition in Victoria. The earlier state league featured eighteen teams but, after restructuring, this number was reduced to ten. The founding ten members of the new league were Ballarat Pride, Boroondara Genesis, Geelong Cougars, Hume City Falcons, Monash University Central, North East Blaze, Peninsula Waves, Southern Saints, VU Western Lightning and Yarra Valley Grammar Ariels. The new league featured  three divisions – the Championship, Division 1 and an Under-19 division. The ten teams enter a team in each division. The new structure was designed to encourage player development.

City West Falcons
Historically, the league's most successful team has been City West Falcons who have won six Championships and 16 premierships across all three divisions. As Hume City Falcons they won the inaugural Championship in 2009 and then retained it in 2010. With a team that included Kathleen Knott they won their first Championship as City West Falcons in 2012  and then retained it in 2013. In 2018, Falcons won their fifth Championship title. Falcons won their sixth Championship title in 2022, also winning the U-19 grand final.

Victorian Fury
The Australian Netball League team Victorian Fury is effectively the representative team of the VNL. In turn, Fury is the reserve team of Melbourne Vixens.

Teams

2023 teams

Notes
  Ariels VCNA previously played as Yarra Valley Grammar Ariels. 
  Boroondara Express previously played as Boroondara Genesis. 
  Casey Demons are affiliated to both the VFL Casey Demons and Melbourne Football Club.  
  City West Falcons previously played as Hume City Falcons.
  Hawks Netball previously played as Melbourne Central, Monash University Central, Monash University Storm. In 2018 they adopted their current name after forming a partnership with Hawthorn Football Club.
  Between 2009 and 2014, Melbourne University Lightning had a partnership with Victoria University and played as VU-Western Lightning.

Former teams

Championship grand finals

Notable players
The VNL is effectively a feeder league for the Suncorp Super Netball teams Melbourne Vixens and Collingwood Magpies. VNL players have also played for the Australia national netball team and other international teams.

Internationals

 Mwai Kumwenda

 Fiona Themann

 Tharjini Sivalingam

Melbourne Vixens

Collingwood Magpies

Award winners
Margaret Caldow Trophy 
The Championship MVP award is named after Margaret Caldow.

Notes
  2012 award was shared. 
  2013 award was shared.
  2021 award was shared.

Player of the Championship Grand Final

Main sponsors

References

 
 
2009 establishments in Australia
Sports leagues established in 2009
Victorian Fury